David Anderson Junior/Senior High School is a public high school in Lisbon, Ohio, United States.  It is the only secondary school in the Lisbon Exempted Village School District. Sports teams compete as the Lisbon Blue Devils in the Ohio High School Athletic Association as a member of the Eastern Ohio Athletic Conference.

Academics
According to the National Center for Education Statistics, in 2019, the school reported an enrollment of 423 pupils in grades 6th through 12th, with 201 pupils eligible for a federal free or reduced-price lunch. The school employed 25 teachers, yielding a student–teacher ratio of 16.92.

David Anderson High School offers courses in the traditional American curriculum.

Entering their third and fourth years, students can elect to attend the Columbiana County Career and Technical Center in Lisbon as either a part time student, taking core courses at DAHS, while taking career or technical education at the career center, or as a full time student instead. Students may choose to take training in automotives, construction technology, cosmetology, culinary arts, health sciences, information technology, multimedia, landscape & environmental design, precision machining, veterinary science, and welding.

A student must earn 28 credits to graduate, including: 4 credits in a mathematics sequence, 3 credits in science, including life and physical science, 4 credits in English, 3 credits in a social studies sequence, 1 credit in fine art, 1 credit in health and physical education, 1 credit in personal finance, and 4.5 elective credits. Elective courses can be in English, science, social studies, foreign language, technology and business, family and consumer science, and fine art. Students attending the career center follow the same basic requirements, but have requirements in career & technical education rather than fine arts. All students must pass Ohio state exams in English I & II, Algebra I, Geometry, Biology, American History, and American Government, or the like.

Athletics
The following is an alphabetical list of sports offered by the high school.
 Baseball
 Basketball
 Cross country running
 Football
 Golf
 Soccer
 Softball
 Swimming
 Track and field
 Volleyball

OHSAA State Championships
Football - 1995
In 1995, the Lisbon Blue Devils boys football team won the OHSAA Division V State Championship against Mariemont High School, the only such championship in football to be held by a Columbiana County school.

Notes and references

External links
 District Website

High schools in Columbiana County, Ohio
Public high schools in Ohio